Polly Braden (born 1974) is a Scottish documentary photographer, living in London. Her work on learning disabilities and autism has been shown in exhibitions at the National Science and Media Museum in Bradford and at mac, Birmingham. Her work on single parent families has been shown in exhibitions at the Museum of the Home in London and Open Eye Gallery in Liverpool. Braden won Photographer of the Year in the Guardian Student Media Award in 2002.

Life and work
Braden was born in Perthshire, Scotland. She graduated from London College of Printing in 2003. She lives in London and is a single parent.

Her subjects have included China (where she lived for over 15 years), the City of London, single parent families, and learning disabilities and autism.

Publications

Books of work by Braden
China Between. Stockport: Dewi Lewis, 2010. . With essays by David Campany and Jennifer Higgie.
Great Interactions: Life with Learning Disabilities and Autism. Stockport: Dewi Lewis, 2016. . With an interview by David Campany and an afterword by Sophie Howarth.
London Square Mile: a Secret City. Tales from the City: Book 8. Hoxton Mini, 2019. . With an essay by David Kynaston.

Books with one other
Adventures in the Lea Valley. East London Photo Stories: Book 12. Hoxton Mini, 2016. With David Campany. .
Out of the Shadows: the untold story of people with autism or learning disabilities. Stockport: Dewi Lewis; West Bromwich: Multistory, 2018. With seven stories by Sally Williams and three first-hand accounts. .
A Place For Me: 50 Stories of Finding Home. Stockport: Dewi Lewis, 2022. With Sally Williams. .

Books with contributions by Braden
Street Photography Now. London: Thames & Hudson, 2010.  (hardback). London: Thames & Hudson, 2011.  (paperback). Edited by Sophie Howarth and Stephen McLaren. Includes work by Braden made in China.

Exhibitions

Solo exhibitions and similar
Great Interactions: Photographs by Polly Braden, National Science and Media Museum, Bradford, 2016
Polly Braden & Sally Williams: Out of the Shadows: the untold story of people with autism or learning disabilities, mac, Birmingham, 2018
Holding The Baby, Museum of the Home, London, 2021; Open Eye Gallery, Liverpool, 2021. With text by Claire-Louise Bennett and Sally Williams.
 Holding The Baby, Arnolfini, Bristol, UK (2022)

Group exhibitions
Real Estate: Art in a Changing City, Institute of Contemporary Arts, London, 2005 included Adventures in the Valley (Ongoing) with Campany
Made in China, Museum of Contemporary Photography, Chicago, 2006
London Street Photography: 1860–2010, Museum of London, London, 2011

Awards
2002: Winner, Photographer of the Year, Guardian Student Media Award

Collections
Braden's work is held in the following permanent collection:
Guildhall Art Gallery, London

References

External links

Documentary photographers
21st-century British photographers
Scottish photographers
Scottish women photographers
People from Perthshire
Living people
1974 births
Women photojournalists